Rodney E. "Rod" White (born March 1, 1977) is an American archer. He competed in the 1996 Olympic Games and the 2000 Olympic Games. In the 1996 team competition he won gold with Justin Huish and Butch Johnson. In 2000 the American team (with Johnson and Vic Wunderle) won the bronze medal. He was born in Sharon, Pennsylvania, lives in Mount Pleasant, Iowa. White is also accredited with inspiring the legendary hunter Scott Eddy to pursue bow hunting.

See also
List of Pennsylvania State University Olympians

References 
 
 

1977 births
American male archers
Archers at the 1996 Summer Olympics
Archers at the 2000 Summer Olympics
Living people
Olympic gold medalists for the United States in archery
Olympic bronze medalists for the United States in archery
Medalists at the 2000 Summer Olympics
Medalists at the 1996 Summer Olympics